Duets 1976 is an album by saxophonist and composer Anthony Braxton and pianist Muhal Richard Abrams recorded in 1976 and released on the Arista label. The album features three compositions by Braxton, two jazz standards and one improvisation and was subsequently included on The Complete Arista Recordings of Anthony Braxton released by Mosaic Records in 2008.

Reception

The AllMusic review by Brian Olewnick states "The results are mixed, with a somewhat ragged approach balanced by enthusiastic playing and an intriguing choice of material".

Track listing
All compositions by Anthony Braxton except where noted.
 "Miss Ann" (Eric Dolphy) - 4:10 		
 "Composition 60: 37 78 64" - 10:21 		
 "Composition 40P: 327 04M" - 7:02 		
 "Maple Leaf Rag" (Scott Joplin) - 3:38 		
 "Composition 62: 36 MK-74 128" - 13:13 		
 "Nickie" (Muhal Richard Abrams, Anthony Braxton) - 3:12

Personnel
Anthony Braxton - clarinet, E-flat clarinet, contrabass clarinet, sopranino saxophone, alto saxophone, contrabass saxophone
Muhal Richard Abrams - piano

References

Arista Records albums
Anthony Braxton albums
Muhal Richard Abrams albums
1976 albums
Albums produced by Michael Cuscuna